Nick Kiriazis (born June 9, 1969) is American television actor.

He played Father Antonio Torres in Sunset Beach from February 1998 to December 1999. In June 2007, he temporarily replaced Rick Hearst for two episodes of General Hospital.

Kiriazis was born in Madison, Wisconsin.

Filmography

TV Series 
 Wings (1996)
 Beverly Hills, 90210 as Prince Carl
 George & Leo (1997)
 Sunset Beach (1998) as Father Antonio Torres
 Titans (2001) as Bryan
 V.I.P. (2001) as Damien Kane
 Boston Public (2001) as Mr. Landis
 Frasier (2002) as Clint
 Providence (2002)
 Charmed (2003) as Evan
 Numb3rs (2005) as Rob Evans
 CSI: NY (2007) as Prosecutor
 General Hospital (2007) as Ric Lansing (temporary recast)
 Law & Order: Los Angeles (2011) as George Patrick
 The Protector (2011) as Jason King

Movies 
 Tin Cup (1996) as Guy At Bar
 Sunset Beach: Shockwave (1998, TV) as Father Antonio Torres
 Eventual Wife (2000) as Richard
 Laurel Canyon (2002) as Justin
 Wide and Open Spaces (2003) as Travis
 Back When We Were Grownups (2004, TV) as Joe
 The Food Chain: A Hollywood Scarytale (2005) as Devon Casey
 Widowmaker (2005) as Sean
 Primal Doubt (2007) as Travis Freeman
 Superhero Movie (2008) as Police Officer
 Desert Vows (2009) as Rich
 Matchmaker Santa (2012) as Bill Hogan

External links 
 
French Website
French forum about Antonio and Gabi's story ♥ 

1969 births
American male film actors
American male television actors
Living people
Actors from Madison, Wisconsin
Male actors from Wisconsin